Rhee Changyong (born 16 May 1960) is a South Korean economist currently serving as the 26th Governor of the Bank of Korea from April 2022.  

In March 2022 President Moon Jae-in tapped Rhee who had led the Asia and Pacific Department at the International Monetary Fund over 8 years for the country's top monetary policy chief upon recommendations from president-elect Yoon Suk-yeol. On 19 April, a nomination hearing was held at the National Assembly where his nomination report was adopted and sent to the President. President Moon appointed Rhee on the following day commencing his four-year term as the Governor to minimise the first-ever vacancy of the Governor in Bank's history.

During the nomination hearing, Rhee vowed to utilise the central bank's "unpopular" tool of base rate to address post-pandemic inflation reiterating the organisation's role in price stabilisation.   

Prior to moving to the IMF as the first South Korean to join its senior leadership, Rhee was the chief economist at the Asian Development Bank where he worked as its spokesperson and head of its Economic and Research Department. Before joining inter-governmental organisations, he first served as an advisor to multiple South Korean government organisations on economic policies from the early 2000s and then joined the transition team of then-president-elect Lee Myung-bak in 2007. Following President Lee's restructuring of government entities, Rhee took the first deputy role of the Financial Services Commission from 2008 to 2009 before joining the Presidential Committee for the 2010 G-20 Seoul Summit as its Secretary-General and Sherpa. 

Rhee holds two degrees in economics - a bachelor from Seoul National University and a doctorate from Harvard University. Rhee completed a doctorate in 1989 at the Harvard University, with Lawrence Summers as his advisor. After his doctoral studies, he taught at economics departments at University of Rochester and Seoul National University.

Honours 

  Order of Civil Merit by the government of South Korea (2011)

References 

Living people
1960 births
Harvard University alumni
Seoul National University alumni
Academic staff of Seoul National University
University of Rochester faculty
International Monetary Fund people
South Korean government officials
South Korean economists
Governors of the Bank of Korea
People from Nonsan